Year 1258 (MCCLVIII) was a common year starting on Tuesday (link will display the full calendar) of the Julian calendar.

Events   
 By place 
 
 Mongol Empire 
 February 10 – Siege of Baghdad: Mongol forces (some 150,000 men) led by Hulagu Khan besiege and conquer Baghdad after a siege of 13 days. During the first week of February, the eastern walls begin to collapse, and the Mongols swarm into the city, on February 10. Caliph Al-Musta'sim surrenders himself to Hulagu – together with all the Abbasid chief officers and officials. They are ordered to lay down their arms and are massacred. Hulagu imprisons Al-Musta'sim among his treasures to starve him to death. Meanwhile, massacres continue throughout the whole city. In 40 days about 80,000 citizens are murdered. The only survivors are the ones who are hiding in cellars which are not discovered, and a number of attractive girls and boys who are kept to be slaves, and the Christian community, who take refuge in the churches which are left undisturbed, by the special orders of Hulagu's wife, Doquz Khatun. 
 February 15 – Hulagu Khan enters Baghdad, where many quarters of the city are ruined by fire. The Great Library (or House of Wisdom) is destroyed, numerous precious book collections are thrown into the Tigris River. Before the siege, about 400,000 manuscripts are rescued by Nasir al-Din al-Tusi, Persian polymath and theologian, who takes them to Maragheh (located in East Azerbaijan Province). With the sack of Baghdad ends the Abbasid Golden Age, many professors, physician, scientist, clerics, artist and lectures are massacred.

 Europe 
 May 11 – Treaty of Corbeil: King Louis IX (the Saint) signs a peace treaty with King James I (the Conqueror). Louis, heir of Charlemagne, formally renounces his feudal overlordship over Catalonia (independent de facto since 988), while James renounces his claims over Occitania.
 June – War of the Euboeote Succession: Achaean forces under William II Villehardouin defeat a coalition of Greek princes led by Guy I de la Roche (Great Lord), duke of Athens, which ends the conflict, on August 6.
 August 10 – Manfred, son of the late Emperor Frederick II, is crowned king of Sicily at Palermo. Pope Alexander IV, who has an alliance with the Saracens, declares the coronation void and excommunicates Manfred.
 August 16 – Theodore II (Laskaris) dies after a 4-year reign at Magnesia. He is succeeded by his 7-year-old son, John IV, as ruler of the Empire of Nicaea. His regent becomes the bureaucrat George Mouzalon.
 August 25 – George Mouzalon is assassinated in Magnesia ad Sipylum, as part of a conspiracy led by Byzantine nobles, under future Emperor Michael VIII (Palaiologos).
 Gissur Þorvaldsson, Icelandic chieftain (or goði), is made Earl of Iceland for his loyal service to King Haakon IV (the Old).

 England 
 May 2  – King Henry III accepts the demand of Simon de Montfort and his baronial supporters that the government is reformed with a committee of 22 barons, including the king. As an act of faith, Simon de Montfort hands over his estates at Odiham and Kenilworth as part of the proposals. The Provisions of Oxford establish baronial control of the government, also known as the Oxford Parliament, on June 11.
 Llywelyn ap Gruffudd, proclaims himself Prince of Wales, first used in an agreement between Llywelyn and his supporters and the Scottish nobility. He becomes the final ruler of an independent Wales, before its conquest by future King Edward I (Longshanks). 

 Levant 
 June 25 – Battle of Acre: The Genoese sends an armada (some 50 galleys) to relieve the blockade at Acre and asks the assistance of Philip of Montfort, lord of Tyre, and the Knights Hospitaller for a combined attack from the land side. The Genoese fleet's arrival takes the Venetians by surprise but the superior experience and seamanship result in a crushing Venetian victory, with half the Genoese ships lost. Later, the Genoese garrison is forced to abandon Acre.Stanton, Charles D. (2015). Medieval Maritime Warfare, pp. 182–184. Pen and Sword. .

 Asia 
 Mongol invasions of Vietnam: Mongol forces (some 30,000 men) under Uriyangkhadai, son of Subutai, invade Vietnam. After many battles, the Vietnam army is routed and defeated. The senior leaders are able to escape on pre-prepared boats, while the remnants are destroyed on the banks of the Red River. The Mongols occupy the capital city, Thăng Long (modern-day Hanoi), and massacred the city's inhabitants, by the end of January.

 By topic 

 Global 
 The consequences of the volcanic Samalas eruption (see 1257) in Indonesia include the following anecdotal accounts: very dry fog in France; lunar eclipses in England; severe winter in Europe; a harsh spring in Iceland; famine in England, Germany, France and Italy; and pestilence in London, parts of France, Austria, Iraq, Syria, and southeast Turkey.

 Markets 
 In Genoa, the Republic starts imposing forced loans, known as luoghi, to its taxpayers; they are a common resource of medieval public finance.

 Religion 
 Civil unrest in northern Italy spawns the medieval musical form of Geisslerlieder, penitential songs sung by wandering bands of Flagellants.

Births 
 March 8 – Arghun Khan, Mongol ruler of the Ilkhanate (d. 1291)
 October 10 – Joachim Piccolomini, Italian altar server (d. 1305)
 October 20 – Bolko I, Polish co-ruler (House of Piast) (d. 1313)
 December 7 – Trần Nhân Tông, Vietnamese emperor (d. 1308)
 Bertrand of Saint-Geniès, French jurist and patriarch (d. 1350) 
 Ferrantino Malatesta, Italian nobleman and knight (d. 1353)
 Henry I, German nobleman (House of Schaumburg) (d. 1304)
 Henryk IV (the Righteous), High Duke of Poland (d. 1290)
 John I, French nobleman (House of Chalon-Arlay) (d. 1315)
 Liu Guandao (or Zhong Xian), Chinese court artist (d. 1336) 
 Usman Serajuddin, Bengali Sufi scholar and mystic (d. 1357)

Deaths 
 January 6 – Konrad I von Wallhausen, bishop of Meissen
 February 20 – Al-Musta'sim, Abbasid caliph of Baghdad
 March 26 – Floris de Voogd, Dutch nobleman (b. 1228)
 April 5 
 Juliana of Liège, Flemish nun, mystic and saint
 Pełka (or Fulko), Polish archbishop of Gniezno
 April 14 – Rüdiger of Bergheim, German bishop (b. 1175)
 May 10 – Sewal de Bovil, English cleric and archbishop
 June 2 
 Edmund de Lacy, English nobleman and knight
 Peter I (or Pedro), Portuguese prince (b. 1187)
 June 15 – Ada of Holland, Dutch noblewoman (b. 1208)
 July 22 – Meinhard I, count of Gorizia (House of Gorizia)
 August 8 – Henry of Lexington, English cleric and bishop
 August 18 – Theodore II (Laskaris), emperor of Nicaea
 August 25 – George Mouzalon, Byzantine high official
 August 28 – Gerhard II of Lippe, German archbishop
 November 8 – Grzymisława of Łuck, Polish princess
 November 10 – William de Bondington, Scottish bishop
 November 23 – John Fitzgeoffrey, English nobleman
 Abu Yahya ibn Abd al-Haqq, Marinid sultan
 Abul Hasan al-Shadhili, Almohad Sufi leader (b. 1196)
 Al-Mahdi Ahmad bin al-Husayn, Yemeni ruler (b. 1216)
 Baha al-Din Zuhayr, Arab secretary and poet (b. 1186) 
 Bartholomew of Brescia, Italian teacher and canonist
 Bruno of Altena-Isenberg, prince-bishop of Osnabrück
 Choe Ui, Korean military leader and dictator (b. 1233)
 Clement of Dunblane, Scottish cleric, friar and bishop
 Eberhard von Sayn, German knight and Landmeister
 Fujiwara no Tomoie, Japanese nobleman (b. 1182)
 Guillaume de Chateauneuf, French Grand Master
 Hong Bok-won, Korean general and official (b. 1206)
 Ibn Abi'l-Hadid, Abbasid scholar and writer (b. 1190)
 Ingerd Jakobsdatter, Danish noblewoman (b. 1200)
 John of Arsuf (or Ibelin), Outremer nobleman (b. 1211)
 John of Wallingford, English abbot, historian and writer
 Robert de la Piere, French magistrate and troubadour
 Sulaiman Shah, Abbasid officer, general and governor
 Walter Comyn, Scottish magnate, adviser and regent

References